Warren Lewis (born 13 April 1971) is a South African former professional footballer.

Biography 
After a few seasons at Moroka Swallows, Lewis decided to become more religious. He chose to refrain from playing matches on the Jewish Sabbath. In 2009, Lewis coached the Maccabi South Africa side at the 2009 Maccabiah Games in Israel.

International 
Lewis earned his first cap for the South Africa national football team in a 2000 COSAFA Cup semi-final match against Zimbabwe on 29 July 2000. His only other appearance for South Africa came in an Africa Cup of Nations qualifier versus Congo in Pointe Noire in September of that same year.

Relocated 

In 2015, Lewis relocated to Israel.

Honours

Club 
Orlando Pirates (Official Tournaments)
 Premier Soccer League: 2000/01
 Top Eight Cup: 2000

Individual 

Southern New Hampshire University
 NSCAA All-America: 1994
 NSCAA All-New England: 1991, 1992, 1994

References

Footnotes

1971 births
Living people
South African Jews
Sportspeople from Durban
Jewish footballers
South African soccer players
AmaZulu F.C. players
Orlando Pirates F.C. players
South Africa international soccer players
Moroka Swallows F.C. players
White South African people
Southern New Hampshire Penmen men's soccer players
Association football defenders
Association football midfielders
Jewish South African sportspeople
Expatriate soccer players in the United States
South African expatriate soccer players
South African expatriate sportspeople in the United States